Tokanui may refer to the following in New Zealand:

In Southland
 Tokanui, Southland, a locality
 Tokanui Branch, a former branch line railway
 Tokanui River, a river flowing into Toetoes Bay

In Waikato
 Tokanui, Waikato, a locality
 Tokanui Psychiatric Hospital, a former psychiatric hospital